The term Syriac Rite or Syrian Rite may refer to:

 West Syriac Rite, liturgical rite of the Syriac Orthodox Church, and the Syriac Catholic Church
 East Syriac Rite, liturgical rite of the Assyrian Church of the East, and the Chaldean Catholic Church

See also
 Syriac (disambiguation)
 Rite (disambiguation)
 Syriac Christianity